There are 9 routes assigned to the "N" zone of the California Route Marker Program, which designates county routes in California. The "N" zone includes county highways lying in Los Angeles and Orange counties.

N1

County Route N1 (CR N1) is a county highway in Los Angeles County, California, United States. It runs  from Pacific Coast Highway / State Route 1 in Malibu along Malibu Canyon Road through the Santa Monica Mountains. After crossing Piuma Road near the top of the mountain, the name changes to Las Virgenes Road where it continues another  to US 101 in Calabasas. Locals refer to the route as a whole as Malibu Canyon. This route was defined in 1963.

CR N1 is part of the State Scenic Highway System in Los Angeles County.

Major landmarks along the route include Pepperdine University on the west side of the road at Pacific Coast Highway.  Soka University had purchased land at King Gillette Ranch along this road near the intersection of Mullholland Highway.  That plan was stopped and the land sold to the National Park Service in 2005.  The main entrance Malibu Creek State Park is just south of that same intersection.  Also nearby is the Malibu Hindu Temple.

Major intersections

N2

County Route N2 (CR N2) is a county highway in Los Angeles County, California, United States. It runs from State Route 138 at Quail Lake to State Route 14 in Palmdale. The route is known as Old Ridge Route Road, Pine Canyon Road, Lake Elizabeth Road, and Palmdale Boulevard.

Route description
CR N2 begins at the junction of State Route 138 at Quail Lake and heads south along the old Ridge Route (as Old Ridge Route Road) to Sandberg, and then southeast, parallel to the San Andreas Fault along Pine Canyon Road to Lake Hughes Road in Lake Hughes.  From there, it continues straight ahead initially southeast along the San Andreas Fault on Lake Elizabeth Road and then, leaving the fault it continues east on Lake Elizabeth Road to 10th Street West / Tierra Subida Avenue in Palmdale.  From there, it continues straight ahead on Palmdale Boulevard to its end at the junction with the Antelope Valley Freeway (State Route 14) and SR 138 in Palmdale.

Major intersections

N3

It was originally surveyed in 1913 and constructed between 1932 and 1941 to access Southern California Edison transmission lines that cross the San Gabriel Mountains between the Antelope Valley and the Los Angeles Basin. It was defined as a county highway in 1963.

Major intersections

N4

County Route N4 (CR N4), known as the Big Pines Highway and Largo Vista Road, is a county highway in Los Angeles County, California, United States. It connects State Route 2 (Angeles Crest Highway) in Big Pines with State Route 138 (Pearblossom Highway) near Llano. It is built directly on the trace of the San Andreas Fault.

Major intersections

N5

County Route N5 (CR N5) is a county highway in Los Angeles County, California, United States. It is known as Avenue J for the most part and is one of the principal major east–west thoroughfares in Lancaster, California. The route runs from State Route 14 (Antelope Valley Freeway) in Lancaster to the Butte Valley Wildflower Sanctuary on 190th Street East near Hi Vista.

Major intersections

N6

County Route N6 (CR N6) is a county highway in Los Angeles County, California, United States. The route connects State Route 138 with Devil's Punchbowl, a popular recreation area. CR N6 is known as Devil's Punch Bowl Road, Tumbleweed Road, Longview Road and a portion of Fort Tejon Road.

Major intersections

N7

County Route N7 (CR N7), known entirely as Hawthorne Boulevard, is a county highway in Los Angeles County, California, United States. It runs through the Palos Verdes Peninsula from Palos Verdes Drive West in Rancho Palos Verdes to the Pacific Coast Highway (State Route 1) in Torrance. Hawthorne Boulevard is signed as State Route 107 north of its intersection with the Pacific Coast Highway (SR 1), ending at its intersection with Redondo Beach Boulevard.

Hawthorne Boulevard ends at Century Boulevard where it continues north to Hollywood as La Brea Avenue.

Hawthorne Boulevard is very distinctive through Lawndale and part of Hawthorne because it is very wide with business parking in the center between the northbound and southbound lanes; the parking area was once part of a Pacific Electric right-of-way.

Landmarks along Hawthorne Boulevard include Point Vicente Lighthouse park and Point Vicente Interpretive Center, Palos Verdes Peninsula High School, South Coast Botanic Garden, Del Amo Fashion Center, South Bay Galleria, Hawthorne Plaza, and a Metro C Line station at Interstate 105.

Metro Local Line 40 provide bus service between Century Boulevard and Artesia Boulevard.  Metro Local Line 344 and Torrance Transit line 8 provide bus service south of Artesia Boulevard, with the former running to the Palos Verdes Peninsula and the latter to Pacific Coast Highway.

Major intersections

N8

County Route N8 (CR N8) is a county highway in the U.S. state of California in Los Angeles and Orange counties. Its southern terminus is at Beach Boulevard (State Route 39) in Buena Park and its northern terminus is at Interstate 10 in West Covina. Only a quarter mile of the route is in Orange County (between Alondra Boulevard and SR 39). CR N8 is known as La Mirada Boulevard from Beach Boulevard in Buena Park to Colima Road in South Whittier, Colima Road from La Mirada Boulevard to Azusa Avenue in Hacienda Heights and Azusa Avenue from Colima Road to I-10 in West Covina.

Major intersections
The entire route is in Los Angeles County except for about a quarter mile in Orange County between Alondra and Beach Boulevards.

N9

County Route N9 (CR N9) is a county highway in Los Angeles County, California, United States, running  from the coast in Malibu through the Santa Monica Mountains to US 101. It runs  from State Route 1 (Pacific Coast Highway) along Kanan Dume Road to Mulholland Highway, and then  from Mulholland Highway along Kanan Road to US 101 in Agoura Hills. The route was defined in 1974.

Major intersections

See also

References

External links

N*